Kausadi is a village in Jintur taluka of Parbhani district in Maharashtra state of India.

Demography
Kausadi has a total of 1,529 families resident. The village has a population of 7,457 of which 3,764 are males while 3,693 are females as per Population Census 2011.

Transport
Parbhani, Sailu, Manwath and Pathri are the nearest cities to Kausadi.

Government and politics
Kausadi comes under Parbhani (Lok Sabha constituency) for Indian general elections. The current member of Parliament representing this constituency is Sanjay Haribhau Jadhav of Shiv Sena.

Kausadi comes under Jintur (Vidhan Sabha constituency) for assembly elections of Maharashtra. The current representative from this constituency in Maharashtra state assembly is Vijay Bhambale of Nationalist Congress Party.

References

Villages in Parbhani district
Parbhani district